Bitur (Bituri, Paswam, Mutum) is Papuan language of Western Province, Papua New Guinea.

Bitur is spoken in Bisuaka, Kasimap, Petom, Tewara, and Upiara villages of Oriomo-Bituri Rural LLG.

References

Further reading

External links 
 ELAR collection: Documentation and description of Bitur and preliminary investigation of the moribund Abom language deposited by Phillip Rogers

Languages of Western Province (Papua New Guinea)
Tirio languages